Delano Township may refer to the following townships in the United States:

 Delano Township, Sedgwick County, Kansas
 Delano Township, Schuylkill County, Pennsylvania